Steinhausen is a settlement in the Omaheke Region of central-eastern Namibia, located north-west of the regional capital Gobabis. It is the district capital of Okarukambe Constituency.

References

Populated places in the Omaheke Region